Raymond William Finnigan (born 22 January 1947) is an English former footballer who played in the Football League for Darlington. A full back, Finnigan began his career as an apprentice with Newcastle United, but never played for them in the league, and went on to play non-league football for Gateshead. He later worked in the motor trade.

References

1947 births
Living people
Sportspeople from Wallsend
Footballers from Tyne and Wear
English footballers
Association football defenders
Newcastle United F.C. players
Darlington F.C. players
Gateshead F.C. players
English Football League players